Music recording certifications are typically awarded by the worldwide music industry based on the total units sold, streamed, or shipped to retailers. These awards and their requirements are defined by the various certifying bodies representing the music industry in various countries and territories worldwide. The standard certification awards given consist of Gold, Platinum, and sometimes Diamond awards, in ascending order; the UK also has a Silver certification, ranking below Gold. In most cases, a "Multi-Platinum" or "Multi-Diamond" award is given for multiples of the Platinum or Diamond requirements.

Many music industries around the world are represented by the International Federation of the Phonographic Industry (IFPI). The IFPI operates in 66 countries and services affiliated industry associations in 45 countries. In some cases, the IFPI is merely affiliated with the already operational certification bodies of a country, but in many countries with lesser-developed industries, the IFPI acts as the sole certifying body servicing the country or region's music industry. Still other countries not represented by the IFPI have certifying bodies operating independently, such as individual record companies which service the country or region's music industry as a whole.

Though all certifying bodies give awards for album sales or shipments, many also certify singles, paid digital downloads, streaming media, music videos, music DVDs, and master ringtones. Additionally, some certifying bodies have separate threshold scales for works of domestic or international origins, varying genres, lengths, and formats. From the 2010s digital streaming was included in some territories.

Albums
Note: Top numbers represent threshold for domestic material, italicized numbers in parentheses represent threshold for international material if different from the domestic requirement. Other notes and exceptions are provided in footnotes below each table. 

 I Australian, Belgian, Danish, Finnish, German, Hungarian, Mexican, Norwegian, Polish, Spanish, Swedish, British and American figures can include digital album sales.
 II GCC sales refer to sales in Bahrain, Kuwait, Oman, Qatar, Saudi Arabia and UAE.
 III For German sales, the thresholds in the table are for albums released from January 1, 2003. For albums released until September 24, 1999, the thresholds are 250,000 for Gold and 500,000 for Platinum. For albums released between September 25, 1999, and December 31, 2002, the thresholds are 150,000 for Gold and 300,000 for Platinum. Also, for Jazz albums, the thresholds are 10,000 for Gold and 20,000 for Platinum. Diamond-award is applicable to titles released on/after January 1, 2013. 
 IV Hungarian sales figures provided refer to "Pop" albums. A separate scale is used for jazz, spoken word, classical, and world music albums: sales exceeding 1,500 and 3,000 for Gold and Platinum awards respectively. 
 V Indian figures provided refer to "Hindi Films" and "International" scales. However, there are six separate release scales in all. Each scale is provided here with Gold and Platinum sales thresholds in parentheses: "Hindi Films" (100,000; 200,000); "Regional Films" (50,000; 100,000); "Regional Basic" (25,000, 50,000); "National Basic" (50,000; 100,000); "Classical/Non-Classical" (15,000; 30,000); and "International" (4,000; 6,000). In addition, there is a time limit for an album in one of the categories to reach gold and platinum, which is in one calendar year (for example: albums released on July 1, 2006, has only until June 30, 2007, for a Gold or Platinum award).
 VI Malaysian sales figures provided refer to albums released after 1 July 2009. For albums released before 1 July 2009, sales exceeding 10,000 and 20,000 for Gold and Platinum awards, respectively. Physical albums only; when combined with digital sales, thresholds are 15,000 for Gold and 30,000 for Platinum, whereby the digital sales are counted as 1/10 actual digital sales (10 downloads = 1 unit).
 VII For Mexican sales, albums add physical, digital and streaming sales, for singles digital and streaming sales are taken into account. It should also be noted that Mexico awards incremental gold certifications even after platinum has been achieved, so an album may be, for example, certified 2× Platinum + Gold.
 VIII Dutch sales figures provided refer to "Popular" albums. A separate scale is used for jazz, classical, and world music albums: sales exceeding 10,000 and 20,000 for Gold and Platinum awards respectively.
 IX Polish sales figures provided refer to domestic "Pop" albums. Separate scales are used for jazz/blues/folk/source music/classical albums, and soundtracks. Each scale is provided here with Gold, Platinum, and Diamond sales thresholds in parentheses: "jazz/blues/folk/source music/classical" (5,000; 10,000; 50,000); and "soundtracks" (10,000; 20,000; 100,000).
 X Swedish sales figures provided refer to "Pop" albums. A separate scale is used for children, jazz, classical, and folk music albums: sales exceeding 10,000 and 20,000 for Gold and Platinum awards respectively.
 XI South African sales figures provided refer to albums released after 1 December 2015. For albums released before 1 December 2015 but after 1 August 2006, a Gold award is given for sales exceeding 20,000 and a Platinum award for sales exceeding 40,000. For albums released before 1 August 2006, a Gold award is given for sales exceeding 25,000, a Platinum award for sales exceeding 50,000.
 XII United Kingdom thresholds were established in 1979 for albums above a minimum . From 1973–79 the thresholds were based on monetary revenue: Platinum (£1,000,000), Gold (£150,000 from April 1973 to September 1974, £250,000 from September 1974 to January 1977, and £300,000 from 1977 until 1979) and Silver (£75,000 from April 1973 to January 1975, £100,000 from January 1975 to January 1977, and £150,000 from 1977 until 1979).
 XIII Awarded for actual retail sales in the following countries: Austria, Belgium, Bulgaria, Czech Republic, Denmark, Finland, France, Germany, Greece, Hungary, Iceland, Ireland, Italy, Luxembourg, Netherlands, Norway, Poland, Portugal, Russia, Serbia, Slovakia, Spain, Sweden, Switzerland, Turkey and United Kingdom.
 XIV South Korean physical album sales exceeding 1,000,000 are given the "Million" award.
 XV Although UPFR's certifications levels have never been clearly defined, it is known that they have been repeatedly lowered since their introduction, due to heavy music piracy and financial crisises in Romania. UPFR's certifications are based on both the units sold and the sales price of an album. Several awards have been handed out since the early 1990s.

Singles

 XIV Australian, Danish, Finnish, German, Irish, Italian, New Zealand, Norwegian, Swedish, and British figures can include sales from legal digital downloads.
 XV For German sales, the thresholds in the table are for singles released from January 1, 2003. For singles released prior to that thresholds are 250,000 for Gold and 500,000 for Platinum. , the German thresholds for the single-titles, are 200,000 for Gold and 400,000 for Platinum. German industry also introduced a Diamond-award which is applicable to all titles released on/after January 1, 2013. For Jazz singles, the thresholds are 10,000 for Gold and 20,000 for Platinum. 
 XVI Malaysian sales figures for physical singles only; when combined with digital sales, thresholds are 15,000 for Gold and 30,000 for Platinum, whereby the digital sales are counted as 1/10 actual digital sales (10 downloads = 1 unit).
 XVII In the United Kingdom, the number of sales required to qualify for Platinum, Gold and Silver discs was dropped for singles released after 1 January 1989 to the current thresholds of Silver (200,000 units), Gold (400,000 units), and Platinum (600,000 units). Prior to this the thresholds were Silver (250,000 units), Gold (500,000 units), and Platinum (1,000,000 units).
 XVIII In the United States, the number of sales required to qualify for Platinum and Gold discs was dropped to the current thresholds of Gold (500,000 units) and Platinum (1,000,000 units), effective 1 January 1989; prior to this the thresholds were Gold (1,000,000 units), and Platinum (2,000,000 units). For EP-length configurations including the 12-inch single, the thresholds were lowered to Gold (250,000 units) and Platinum (500,000 units); previously the thresholds were Gold (500,000 units) and Platinum (1,000,000 units). From then on, the lowered thresholds applied to certification of all singles, regardless of whether they were released before or after the change.

Digital download singles

 XIX Japanese awards refer to online singles and mobile singles.
 XX Japanese physical and digital download sales exceeding 1,000,000 are given the "Million" award.

Music videos/DVDs

 XXI Danish DVD sales figures provided refer to Music/Single DVDs. Full-length DVDs are on a differing scale: sales exceeding 10,000 and 20,000 for Gold and Platinum awards (beginning January 7, 2011), reduced from 15,000 and 30,000 copies, respectively.
 XXII Hungarian DVD sales figures provided refer to "Pop" DVDs. A separate scale is used for jazz, spoken word, classical, and world music DVDs: sales exceeding 1,000 and 2,000 for Gold and Platinum awards respectively.
 XXIII Polish sales figures provided refer to "Pop" music videos. A separate scale is used for jazz/classical music videos: sales exceeding 2,500, 5,000, and 25,000 for Gold, Platinum, and Diamond awards respectively.
 XXIV U.S. sales figures provided refer to "Video singles". A separate scale is used for "Long form videos" and "Multi-Box Music Video Sets": sales exceeding 50,000 and 100,000 for Gold and Platinum awards respectively.

Master ringtones

 XXV Japanese master ringtone sales exceeding 1,000,000, is awarded "million", rather than "diamond".

See also

RIAA certification
List of best-selling albums
List of best-selling singles
Global music industry market share data

References

General

Specific

External links
IFPI official website

Music industry
 
Recording Certifications